Aravindhan is a 1997 Indian Tamil-language film written and directed by newcomer T. Nagarajan, starring Sarath Kumar, Parthiban, Nagma, Oorvasi, Prakash Raj and Visu in lead and pivotal roles. The film marks the debut of noted music composer Yuvan Shankar Raja, musician Ilaiyaraaja's youngest son, and the debut of cinematographer R. Rathnavelu. The film is based on the 1968 Kilvenmani massacre, in which 44 people were burnt alive.

Plot 
Aravindhan is preparing to clear IPS to become a police officer. But after he sees Thamizhvannan, shown as a Naxalite, shot dead by police, Aravindhan starts a fight against police and corrupt politicians.

Aravindhan gets supported by the people for his strict fight against corruption. Anu loves Aravindhan, but her father does not accept the relation. The police wants to put Aravindhan in jail for the politicians, so Aravindhan goes into hiding. On the way, he hides in Gayathri's home. The police tries to catch Aravindhan but at the same time, thinks Gayathri tried to give shelter to Aravindhan, so Gayathri's father dies. Now Aravindhan understands that he has to save Gayathri, so he takes her with him to a factory area to stay.

Aravindhan works in the factory and life goes along smooth for him as he marries Gayathri and has a child. Once in factory, the manager does not give fair price to the workers, which Aravindhan protests, so he beats the manager very poorly. The factory people now identifies Aravindhan's true identity as a Naxalite. The police comes in search of Aravindhan, who finally surrenders in court. In jail, Aravindhan writes lot of anti-corruption articles. This gives Aravindhan wide public support to get elected as a minister. The corrupt politicians want to avoid this uprising and hire a gunman to shoot Aravindhan. During a stage speaking with many people around, the gunman shoots and kills Aravindhan, thus precluding him from becoming minister.

Cast 
 Sarath Kumar as Aravindhan
 Parthiban as Thamizhvannan
 Nagma as Anu
 Oorvasi as Gayathri
 Prakash Raj as Rama Ganapathy
 Visu
 Anand Raj as Ramanathan
 Thilakan as Gopalakrishnan Naidu
 Thalaivasal Vijay as Muthukrishnan
 Ponnambalam
 Liaqath Ali Khan
 Delhi Ganesh

Soundtrack 
The film score and the soundtrack were composed by Ilaiyaraaja's youngest son, Yuvan Shankar Raja, who made his debut in this film. T. Siva, the producer of the film, after hearing some of Yuvan Shankar Raja's tunes, asked him to compose a trailer music and after being impressed of it, gave Yuvan Shankar the assignment to compose the entire film score including a soundtrack for that film. Yuvan Shankar Raja was 16 at the time of the release and one of the youngest composers ever in the industry.

Release and reception 
The film released on 28 February 1997 and flopped miserably at the box-office.

References

External links 
 

1990s Tamil-language films
1997 directorial debut films
1997 films
Films about Naxalism
Films scored by Yuvan Shankar Raja
Indian films based on actual events